The Norton Anthology of Theory & Criticism is an anthology of literary theory and criticism written in or translated to English that is published by the W. W. Norton & Company, one of several such compendiums. The first edition was published in 2001, with a second edition published in 2010 and a third in 2018. Texts range from the 5th century BCE to the present day.

Contents
The anthology is organized by author, the order being determined by their birth year. Most inclusions are essays or book chapters, and some authors have several works listed. The following is a list of authors represented in the anthology's third edition.

Gorgias of Leontini
Plato
Aristotle
Horace
Longinus
Augustine of Hippo
Moses Maimonides
Thomas Aquinas
Dante Alighieri
Giovanni Boccaccio
Christine de Pizan
Joachim du Bellay
Giacopo Mazzoni
Sir Philip Sidney
Pierre Corneille
John Dryden
Baruch Spinoza
Aphra Behn
Giambattista Vico
Joseph Addison
Alexander Pope
Samuel Johnson
David Hume
Immanuel Kant
Edmund Burke

Gotthold Ephraim Lessing
Friedrich von Schiller
Mary Wollstonecraft
Germaine Necker de Staël
Friedrich Schleiermacher
Georg Wilhelm Friedrich Hegel
William Wordsworth
Samuel Taylor Coleridge
Percy Bysshe Shelley
Ralph Waldo Emerson
Edgar Allan Poe
Karl Marx and Friedrich Engels
Matthew Arnold
Walter Pater
Henry James
Friedrich Nietzsche
Oscar Wilde
Sigmund Freud
Ferdinand de Saussure
W. E. B. Du Bois
Virginia Woolf
György Lukács
T. S. Eliot
John Crowe Ransom
Martin Heidegger

Antonio Gramsci
Zora Neale Hurston
Erich Auerbach
Walter Benjamin
Mikhail M. Bakhtin
Max Horkheimer and Theodor W. Adorno
F. R. Leavis
Roman Jakobson
Friedrich A. Hayek
Leo Strauss
Jacques Lacan
Langston Hughes
Lionel Trilling
Hannah Arendt
Cleanth Brooks
William K. Wimsatt Jr. and Monroe C. Beardsley
Simone de Beauvoir
Claude Lévi-Strauss
J. L. Austin
Northrop Frye
Roland Barthes
Louis Althusser
Paul de Man
C. D. Narasimhaiah
Raymond Williams

Frantz Fanon
Gilles Deleuze and Félix Guattari
Jean-François Lyotard
Michel Foucault
Wolfgang Iser
Hayden White
Jean Baudrillard
Jürgen Habermas
Adrienne Rich
Chinua Achebe
Adūnīs
Harold Bloom
Pierre Bourdieu
Jacques Derrida
Li Zehou
Toni Morrison
Richard Ohmann
Stuart Hall
Susan Sontag
Fredric Jameson
David Harvey
Edward W. Said
Monique Wittig
Benedict Anderson
Sandra M. Gilbert and Susan Gubar

E. Ann Kaplan
Hélène Cixous
Gerald Graff
Stanley E. Fish
Ngugi wă Thiong'o, Taban Lo Liyong, and Henry Owuor-Anyumba
Tzvetan Todorov
Karatani Kōjin
Julia Kristeva
Laura Mulvey
Giorgio Agamben
Gloria Anzaldúa
Gayatri Chakravorty Spivak
Terry Eagleton
Stephen J. Greenblatt
Donna Haraway
N. Katherine Hayles
Susan Bordo
Bruno Latour
Martha C. Nussbaum
Homi K. Bhabha
Lennard J. Davis
Gayle Rubin
Slavoj Žižek
Henry Louis Gates Jr.
Franco Moretti

Eve Kosofsky Sedgwick
Hamid Dabashi
Dick Hebdige
bell hooks
Rosi Braidotti
Rob Nixon
Judith Butler
Paul Gilroy
Andrew Ross
Jane Bennett
Lauren Berlant and Michael Warner
Rey Chow
Kenneth W. Warren
Kelly Oliver
Michael Hardt and Antonio Negri
Judith Jack Halberstam
David Herman
Marc Bousquet
Mark McGurl
Stephen Best and Sharon Marcus
Timothy Morton
Alondra Nelson
Sianne Ngai
Ian Bogost

External links
The Norton Anthology of Theory and Criticism, Third Edition

American anthologies
W. W. Norton & Company books
Publications established in 2001